The Sokoto River (formerly known as Gulbi 'n Kebbi) is a river in north-west Nigeria and a tributary of the River Niger. It flows north-west passing Gusau in Zamfara State, where the Gusau Dam forms a reservoir that supplies the city with water. 
Further downstream the river enters Sokoto State where it passes by Sokoto and is joined by the Rima River, then turning south and flowing through Birnin Kebbi in Kebbi State.

The plains around the river are widely cultivated and the river used as a source of irrigation. The river is also an important means of transport. It has had significant impact on downstream floodplain cultivation.

References

 The Hydrology and Plankton of the River Sokoto . J. Holden, J. Green. Journal of Animal Ecology, Vol. 29, No. 1 (May, 1960), pp. 65–84. 
 Isotope And Geochemical Characterization Of Surface And Subsurface Waters In The Semi-Arid Sokoto Basin, Nigeria, Adelana et al.,  African Journal of Science and Technology (AJST), Science and Engineering Series Vol. 4, No. 2, pp. 80–89, December 2003 

 
Rivers of Nigeria
Tributaries of the Niger River